The 1961–62 Scottish Second Division was won by Clyde who, along with second placed Queen of the South, were promoted to the First Division. Brechin City finished bottom.

Table

References 

 Scottish Football Archive

Scottish Division Two seasons
2
Scot